Tejen Kola may refer to:
 Tejen Kola-ye Olya
 Tejen Kola-ye Sofla